Drew Kemp (born 11 August 2002) is a British motorcycle speedway rider.

Career
In 2019, riding for Kent Kings Kemp won the Division 3 Pairs with Anders Rowe, the National Trophy and finished runner-up in the NDL Riders' Championship behind his teammate Rowe. He reached the final of the 2019 U19 European Championship.

Kemp joined Eastbourne Eagles on 19 November 2019, for their 2020 SGB Championship season. It was confirmed, on 18 February 2020, that he would ride for his hometown club Ipswich Witches in the SGB Premiership. He was brought into the side after the suicide of his former Mildenhall Fen Tigers teammate Danny Ayres. However the season was curtailed by the COVID-19 pandemic.

Kemp rode for the Ipswich Witches for the SGB Premiership 2021 and the Eastbourne Eagles for the SGB Championship 2021. The following year in 2022, he rode for the Wolverhampton Wolves in the SGB Premiership 2022 and for the Poole Pirates in the SGB Championship 2022. Kemp was part of the Poole team that successfully defended their tier 2 League and KO Cup double crown.

References 

2002 births
Living people
British speedway riders
Cradley Heathens riders
Eastbourne Eagles riders
Ipswich Witches riders
Mildenhall Fen Tigers riders
Poole Pirates riders
Sheffield Tigers riders